is a railway station in the town of Marumori, Miyagi Prefecture, Japan, operated by the third-sector railway operator AbukumaExpress

Lines

Station layout
The station has one side platform serving a single bi-directional track. There is no station building, but only a shelter built on the platform. The station is unattended.

Adjacent stations

History
Kitamarumori Station opened with the start of operations of the Abukuma Express on July 1, 1986.

Surrounding area

See also
 List of Railway Stations in Japan

External links

  

Railway stations in Miyagi Prefecture
Abukuma Express Line
Railway stations in Japan opened in 1986
Marumori, Miyagi